Ready for the World is an album by the American R&B singer INOJ, released in 1999. The album took three years to complete.  

The first single, "Love You Down", was released in December 1996; it peaked at number 25 on the Billboard 100 in February 1998.  In July 1998, "Time After Time" was released, and eventually peaked at number 6 on the Billboard Hot 100.

Track listing
 "All I Want" 4:04
 "Movin' On" 4:14
 "Time After Time" 4:13
 "Fallin'" 4:08
 "Wait for You" 4:21
 "Precious Love" 3:43
 "I Found Love" 4:11
 "Rather Be Alone" 4:39
 "What Can I Do" 4:02
 "Phone Intro" 0:38
 "Freaky" 4:09
 "Need to Feel" 3:53
 "Can't Wait" 3:49
 "Ring My Bell" 6:57
 "Love You Down" 4:20

Covers
Time After Time – originally written by Cyndi Lauper
Ring My Bell – originally written by Anita Ward
Love You Down – originally written by Melvin Riley of Ready for the World

References

1999 albums
Columbia Records albums